The 2017 League of Ireland First Division season is the 33rd season of the League of Ireland First Division. The league began on 24 February 2017 and concludes on 7 October 2017. The 2017 season had no promotion/relegation play-off system like the previous years, only one team would be eligible for promotion whilst three teams would be relegated from the League of Ireland Premier Division in a revamp of the leagues by the FAI.

And returning to the League of Ireland Premier Division for the first time in 10 years was Waterford who won promotion with two games to spare as their 3–0 win over south east rivals Wexford coupled with nearest rivals Cobh Ramblers 3–0 defeat to Cabinteely secured the league title.

Overview
The First Division has 8 teams. Each team played each other four times, twice at home and twice away, for a total of 28 matches in the season.

On 22 December 2016, the FAI announced that the league would be restructured into two 10-team divisions from the 2018 season onwards, one of the recommendations made in the 2015 Conroy Report. This meant the cancellation of the promotion/relegation playoff and relegation at the end of the 2017 season of 3 teams from the Premier Division, with only the champions of the First Division promoted in return.

Teams

Stadia and locations

Personnel and kits

Note: Flags indicate national team as has been defined under FIFA eligibility rules. Players may hold more than one non-FIFA nationality.

League table

Results

Matches 1–14
Teams play each other twice (once at home, once away).

Matches 15–28
Teams play each other twice (once at home, once away).

Top scorers

Awards
The PFAI First Division player of the year nominees were Waterford striker David McDaid, Cabinteely midfielder Kieran Marty Waters and UCD striker George Kelly.

PFAI First Division Team of Year

The PFAI First Division Team of the Year was:
Goalkeeper: Niall Corbett (UCD)
Defence: Daniel O'Reilly (Longford Town), Kenny Browne (Waterford), Chris McCarthy (Cobh Ramblers), Evan Osam (UCD)
Midfield: Garry Comerford (Waterford), Greg Sloggett (UCD), Kirean Marty Waters (Cabinteely), Derek Daly (Waterford)
Attack: David McDaid (Waterford), George Kelly (UCD)

See also
 2017 League of Ireland Premier Division
 2017 League of Ireland Cup

References

 
League of Ireland First Division seasons
2017 League of Ireland
2017 in Republic of Ireland association football leagues
Ireland
Ireland